Trevor Meier (born July 7, 1973) is a retired ice hockey left winger. He has dual-citizenship with Canada and Switzerland.

Trevor was born in Oakville, Ontario, Canada. He grew up in Burlington, Ontario, Canada playing for the local rep hockey system until he decided to play hockey for Nelson High School at the age of 16.  In the summer of 1992 he had an open "free-skate" tryout with the coach of Herisau SC in Switzerland who, impressed with his skill, invited him over to play in the Swiss B league.  After a successful first year in Herisau, he signed with SC Bern in 1993 and competed in the Swiss Nationalliga A for the rest of his career.  He played for SC Bern (NLA Champion 1997, 2010), HC Lugano (NLA Champion 1999), SC Lausanne, SC Langnau, EV Zug, and HC Ambri-Piotta.

External links

Euro Hockey

1973 births
Nelson High School (Ontario) alumni
Canadian ice hockey left wingers
Canadian emigrants to Switzerland
EV Zug players
HC Ambrì-Piotta players
HC Lugano players
Ice hockey people from Ontario
Naturalised citizens of Switzerland
People from Oakville, Ontario
SC Bern players
SC Herisau players
SC Langnau players
SC Lausanne players
Swiss ice hockey players
Swiss people of Canadian descent
Living people
Canadian expatriate ice hockey players in Switzerland